Meisa (めいさ, メイサ, 冥砂) is a Japanese feminine given name.

People
 , Japanese AV actress
 , Japanese photographer
 , Japanese AV actress
 , Japanese actress and singer

Japanese feminine given names